Mason, also known as Sam No, is an American pornographic film director.

Early life
Mason was born in Los Angeles, California and spent some time in Seattle, Washington during her youth. She earned a degree in political science prior to working in the adult film industry.

Career
Mason met Rodney Moore at a convention and began working for him as a camera operator and film editor. She later worked for Andre Madness, who put her in touch with Elegant Angel. She worked as a director for Elegant Angel until February 2003 when she left the company due to changes in management. In April of that year, she signed an exclusive directing contract with the studio Platinum X. Her first film for Platinum X, Mason’s Sexual Disorder, was released on October 14, 2003. In February 2005, she was released from her contract with Platinum X for not filming enough movies. The following month, she signed a one-year exclusive 12-picture directing deal with Hustler Video. She only directed one film for Hustler before leaving in June 2005 because the company's creative vision was heading in a different direction than previously planned. In September 2007, she began directing for Elegant Angel again. In July 2013, she became an exclusive director for OpenLife Entertainment. The following month, OpenLife Entertainment launched two studios, EroticaX and HardX, both helmed by Mason. In November 2015, O.L. Entertainment launched Dark X, an interracial pornography studio which is also helmed by Mason. In 2015, Mason became the first woman to win the AVN Award for Director of the Year.

Awards and nominations

References

External links
 
 
 Mason's directing credits at the AFDB

American women cinematographers
American film editors
American pornographic film directors
Film directors from Washington (state)
Living people
Filmmakers from Seattle
Women pornographic film directors
American cinematographers
Film directors from Los Angeles
American women film editors
Year of birth missing (living people)